Kathy Searle is an American film and theater actress. She is best known for her role in My Man Is a Loser. Searle starred in several TV series including Body of Proof, Blue Bloods, Gossip Girl, and Lipstick Jungle.

Early life and education
Born in New Rochelle, New York, Searle went to New Rochelle High School. Her early acting career started at the age of 12. Following that, she took admission in American Academy of Dramatic Arts. Searle also went to Upright Citizens Brigade for her comedy career.

Career
At the age of 12, Searle started her acting career with commercials and small roles in TV shows. She appeared in several TV shows including The Bunny Hole, Law & Order, Gossip Girl and As the World Turns. 
Other than that, she also performed in various films. She had leading roles in My Man Is a Loser and Being Michael Madsen. Searle starred in the a cappella musical comedy Perfect Harmony at the Clurman Theatre in New York City and also had some roles in theater such as Apple Cove and The Awesome 80s Prom.

Filmography

Film

Television

Video games

Awards
Outstanding actress – Planet Connection Festival (2014)
Special guest star - NYC Web Fest (2015)
Best actress – 48 Hour Film Festival (2016)

References

External links

Kathy Searle Filmography on AlloCiné

Actresses from New Rochelle, New York
American television actresses
American film actresses
American stage actresses
Living people
21st-century American women
Year of birth missing (living people)